Dae-hyun is a Korean masculine given name. Its meaning differs based on the hanja used to write each syllable of the name. There are 17 hanja with the reading "dae" and 35 hanja with the reading "hyun" on the South Korean government's official list of hanja which may be registered for use in given names.

People with this name include:
An Dae-hyun (born 1962), South Korean Greco-Roman wrestler
Daniel Dae Kim (Korean name Kim Dae-hyun, born 1968), South Korean-born American actor
David Cho (journalist) (Korean name Kim Dae-hyun, born 1972 or 1973), American journalist of Korean descent
Chong Tae-hyon (born 1978), South Korean baseball player
Yoo Dae-hyun (born 1990), South Korean football player
Jung Dae-hyun (born 1993), South Korean singer, member of boy group B.A.P
Jang Dae-hyeon (born 1997), South Korean singer, former member of RAINZ, current member of WEi

See also
List of Korean given names

References

Korean masculine given names